Malita, officially the Municipality of Malita,  is a 1st class municipality and capital of the province of Davao Occidental, Philippines. According to the 2020 census, it has a population of 118,197 people.

Malita is known for various cultural arts and heritage of its people and tribes. Gaginaway Festival is celebrated annually every full moon on the month of November and Araw ng Malita is also celebrated annually on November 17.

Etymology
According to folk etymology, the name "Malita" is derived from the Spanish word "maleta" which means suitcase. It is said that purportedly Don Mariano Peralta, a retired veteran of the Spanish–American War who ventured to the place, decided to live on the vast, fertile plain across the river. One day while bodily fording the deep and swift river with his suitcase and other belongings in hand, the force of the current overwhelmed his perilous balance and got swept by the water consequently losing his grip on the suitcase. His frantic shouts of "maleta, maleta" attracted the attention of the bathing natives who after realizing the situation promptly responded and retrieved the vanishing to settle as Malita. How it came to its present spelling and usage maybe attributed to the natives’ prevalent use of suitcase. Hardly forgetting the shouts of Peralta, the natives later thought the word referred to the land he intended long 'e' sound for the vowels 'i' and 'e'.

History
Malita is the oldest community in the province. Malita's existence dates back scores of years before its formal creation as municipality on November 17, 1936. Records show that Malita must have existed long before the passage of the Philippine Commission Act, the Laws of the Moro Province that mentioned Malita in Section 1 of Act No. 164 dated December 10, 1904. Through the said Act it is presumed that it existed as a barrio of Santa Cruz long before the coming of the Americans to Davao. Executive Order No. 64 issued by President Manuel L. Quezon officially created Malita into a municipality. Marcelino Maruya, from whom the town of Don Marcelino was named after, was the first appointed municipal mayor.

Waves of migrants from the Visayan islands, most of whom hail from Cebu, came on what is now Malita long before it became a municipality. They were later followed by immigrants from Luzon. Even after the destruction brought by World War II by the belligerents, there are still waves of migrants towards Malita and other parts of then-Davao province. This increased its population until it later became the most populous municipality in the province.

Geography

Climate

Barangays

The municipality of Malita is subdivided into 30 barangays:

Demographics

Economy

The municipality is the main economic center of Davao Occidental province. Agriculture and fishery is the main industry of the municipality. Being far from other major urban centers in its vicinity like Davao City, Digos, and General Santos, and although only a town, Malita also serves as the major urban center of the province. However, as economic activity in the town continues its rapid growth, Malita will soon become the province's first component city for years to come.

Government

Municipal officials (2013-2016):
 Congressman: Franklin Bautista (2nd District of Davao del Sur)
 Mayor: Benjamin Bautista, Jr.
 Vice Mayor: Bradly Bautista
Councilors:
 Estefanie T. Bautista
 Zaldy S. Lataban
 Marianela C. Malinao
 Ali G. Colina, Jr.
 Artemio J. Peralta
 Paulito M.  Montero
 Jimmy L. Danwata
 Raymund G. Danwata

Education

Tertiary
Southern Philippines Agri-Business and Marine and Aquatic School of Technology - Poblacion, Malita (Main Campus) and Buhangin, Malita (Buhangin Campus)
Adventure College of Malita, Inc.
Seng Pek Chuan Academy, Inc.
Don Juan Technical Academy of Davao, Inc. (Malita Branch)

Secondary

B'laan National High School
Benjamin V. Bautista Sr. Special High School
Demoloc Valley National High School
Fishing Village Comprehensive National High School
Holy Cross of Malita, Inc.
Mariano Peralta National High School (Campuses in barangays: Poblacion, Sangay, Manuel Peralta, Datu Danwata, Talogoy, Pangian, and New Argao)
Ticulon National High School
Tubalan Comprehensive National High School

References

External links
 Malita Profile at the DTI Cities and Municipalities Competitive Index
 [ Philippine Standard Geographic Code]
 Philippine Census Information
 Local Governance Performance Management System

Municipalities of Davao Occidental
Provincial capitals of the Philippines
Establishments by Philippine executive order